Michael Angelo LiPetri (July 6, 1929 – November 17, 2016) was an American professional baseball player.

LiPetri's professional career got off to a rousing start in 1953, when he won 15 of 17 decisions for the Granby Phillies of the Class C Provincial League and he compiled a .628 winning percentage in 78 decisions during his seven-year minor league baseball career, which stretched from 1953 to 1959. In parts of two MLB seasons, he allowed nine earned runs and 13 hits over 15 innings of work, striking out nine and walking three.

LiPetri died on November 17, 2016, and is buried at Cemetery of the Holy Rood in Westbury, NY.

References

External links

1929 births
2016 deaths
Americus Phillies players
Asheville Tourists players
Baseball players from New York (state)
Bradford Phillies players
Granby Phillies players
Major League Baseball pitchers
Miami Marlins (IL) players
Philadelphia Phillies players
Schenectady Blue Jays players
Sportspeople from Brooklyn
Baseball players from New York City
Syracuse Chiefs players
Tulsa Oilers (baseball) players
Williamsport Grays players
Wilmington Blue Rocks (1940–1952) players
Burials at the Cemetery of the Holy Rood